The African University of Science and Technology (AUST) is an international undergraduate and post-graduate university located in Abuja, Nigeria. It was founded in 2007 as the first part of a pan-African university system concept developed by the Nelson Mandela Institution (NMI). The university offers postgraduate programs in five major disciplinary areas: Computer Science and Management of Information Technology, Material Science and Engineering, Petroleum Engineering, Pure, Applied Mathematics, and Space and Aerospace Sciences, and also a master's degree in Public Administration and Public Policy. Visiting professors include Africans working in the diaspora. 

AUST was founded in 2007 as the first campus of the pan-African Nelson Mandela Institution. From its inception, it offered only postgraduate courses. In December 2022 it graduated 145 people from 11 countries, 38 with doctorates.

Winston Wole Soboyejo was president and provost from January 2012 to August 2014. , Azikiwe Peter Onwualu is acting president.

See also
 Nelson Mandela African Institute of Science and Technology

References

External links
 Official website

Technical universities and colleges
2007 establishments in Nigeria
Educational institutions established in 2007